October Faction may refer to:

 October Faction (band), an off-shot band to Black Flag
 October Faction (album), an eponymous album by the band of the same name
 October Faction, a comic published by IDW Publishing
 October Faction (TV series), a Netflix series based on the IDW comic